David L. Clark is a paleontologist. He was the W.H. Twenhofel Professor of Geology and Geophysics at the University of Wisconsin–Madison, Madison, Wisconsin.

In 1972, he described the conodont genus Neostreptognathodus.

Awards and tributes 
In 2001, he received the Raymond C. Moore Medal which is awarded by the Society for Sedimentary Geology to persons who have made significant contributions in the field which have promoted the science of stratigraphy by research in paleontology.

The conodont genus name Clarkina and species name Streptognathodus clarki are tributes to David Leigh Clark.

Works 
 Conodonts and Zonation of the Upper Devonian in the Great Basin. David Leigh Clark and Raymond Lindsay Ethington
 Conodont Biofacies and Provincialism. David Leigh Clark, 1984 (link to book)
 Heteromorph Ammonoids from the Albian and Cenomanian of Texas and Adjacent Areas. David Leigh Clark
 Fossils, Paleontology, and Evolution. David Leigh, Clark

References 

 Joy, J.A. & Clark, D.L. 1977: The distribution, ecology and systematics of the benthic Ostracoda of the central Arctic Ocean. Micropaleontology, 23 (2), pages 129-154

External links 
 
 David Leigh Clark at University of Wisconsin website  (retrieved 7 June 2016)

Living people
American paleontologists
Conodont specialists
University of Wisconsin–Madison faculty
Year of birth missing (living people)
Place of birth missing (living people)